"I'm an Indian Too" is a song from the 1946 musical Annie Get Your Gun, by Irving Berlin. It was originally performed by Ethel Merman. It is sung by the main character Annie after Sitting Bull adopts her into the Sioux tribe.

It is typical of mid-20th-century views of Native Americans, and is sometimes considered racist and demeaning from a contemporary perspective, although others see it as a mildly satirical attack on racial stereotyping. Native Americans did protest outside the New York theatre, as well as movie theaters, holding picket signs stating:  "Don't See "Annie Get Your Gun". As a result of this reaction, many contemporary productions have omitted the song from their revivals, and the protests stopped.

In 1979, the song was remixed and released as a dance track by disco artist Don Armando.

Other singers to have recorded the song include Doris Day (for the 1963 album Annie Get Your Gun), Judy Garland and Betty Hutton.

References

Songs from Annie Get Your Gun
Songs written by Irving Berlin
1946 songs
Doris Day songs
Anti-indigenous racism in the United States